Curt Gerard Kaufman (born July 19, 1957) is an American former professional baseball player. In Major League Baseball (MLB), he appeared in 40 games pitched, all but one as a relief pitcher, for the New York Yankees (1982–1983) and California Angels (1984).

Career
After graduating from high school, Kaufman received an athletic scholarship to Iowa State University. He then worked his way through the minors with ease, even setting the International League record for saves in a season (25). He was then recognized for his efforts by the Yankees, who called him up in 1982. He remained a Yankee through the 1983 season, but was traded to the California Angels after the season for infielder Tim Foli. He only played one season with the Angels; his career was cut short by a career ending elbow surgery. He retired after the surgery with a career ERA of 4.48, 50 strikeouts, a save, and an overall record of 3–3.

Kaufman currently coaches the JV team at Glenwood, Iowa.

References

Sources

1957 births
Living people
American expatriate baseball players in Canada
Baseball coaches from Nebraska
Baseball players from Nebraska
California Angels players
Charlotte O's players
Columbus Clippers players
Edmonton Trappers players
Fort Lauderdale Yankees players
Iowa State Cyclones baseball players
Major League Baseball pitchers
Nashville Sounds players
New York Yankees players
Oneonta Yankees players
People from Glenwood, Iowa
Sportspeople from Omaha, Nebraska